The women's heptathlon competition at the 2016 Summer Olympics in Rio de Janeiro, Brazil, was won by Nafissatou Thiam of Belgium. The event was held at the Olympic Stadium on 12–13 August.

Summary
The defending 2012 Olympic champion and the 2015 World Champion, Britain's Jessica Ennis-Hill ranked second on the years rankings with 6733  points. The 2015 World runner-up Brianne Theisen-Eaton of Canada topped the season's lists with 32 points more. Katarina Johnson-Thompson had one of the highest personal best scores, though her fitness for the two-day event was in question, ranking 17th in the world. Other strong entrants included 2016 European Champion Anouk Vetter and world medallist Laura Ikauniece-Admidiņa (ranked third and fourth for the season). While South American Champion Evelis Aguilar from Colombia did not reach the top 10 she improved her personal best in 5 events during the competition.

Day one
In the first event Ennis-Hill was the expected top finisher with 12.84 seconds (her best in a championship since the London Olympics). Theisen-Eaton was off her best at 13.18 and Johnson-Thompson was a tenth off her own. The top three performers were rounded out by Barbadian Akela Jones (13.00) and Dutchwoman Nadine Visser (13.02).

World heptathlon bests came in the high jump, courtesy of Belgium's Nafissatou Thiam and Johnson-Thompson's clearances of 1.98 m (the latter setting an outright British record). The pair led the rankings after the second event. Jones was short of her best but still cleared 1.89 m to place fourth. Ennis-Hill and Theisen-Eaton performed close to their best and remained in the top five overall.

Despite an elbow injury, Thiam topped the shot put with 14.91 m to take the lead in the third round. Solid marks from Ennis-Hill, Theisen-Eaton and Jones saw them remain in the top five. Her weakest event, Johnson-Thompson slid to out of the lead and into sixth place after a poor 11.68 m. Germany's Carolin Schäfer moved into the top five with a personal best. Barbara Nwaba and Visser placed in the top three of this event but remained outside the top eight.

In the last event of the day, Johnson-Thompson was best in the 200 m, winning in 23.26 seconds to lift herself back to fourth. Ennis-Hill was the next best, moving into the lead as a result, and Thiam was in second after delivering her best first-day performance. Jones and Schäfer made up the top five, while a slow run from Theisen-Eaton saw her drop to sixth.

Day two
Thiam regained the lead as a result of a 6.58 m personal best in the long jump. Britain's Ennis-Hill and Johnson-Thompson both were a little short of their best with 6.34 m and 6.51 m, respectively, but remained in the top three. Akela Jones stayed in fourth place. Theisen-Eaton scored over 1000 points in the event, but remained nearly 150 points off the lead in fifth. Claudia Rath was the second best performer of the round with 6.55 m but was down the order in 14th.

Despite carrying an elbow injury, Thiam excelled in the javelin with a personal best of 53.13 m. Ennis-Hill remained in second through her throw of 46.06 m, while Theisen-Eaton's 47.36 m put her ahead of fourth-placed Schäfer. A poor throw of 36.36 m pushed Johnson-Thompson out of medal contention. Latvia's Laura Ikauniece-Admidina was the best of the round with 55.93 m, moving into fifth before the final event. Sofía Yfantídou of Greece was the other strong performer of the event with 54.57 m, moving her out of last place.

At the start of the seventh event, Thiam had a 142-point lead worth nearly ten seconds for the 800 m. In the final race, Ennis-Hill took to the front and was on for a personal best at the halfway point, trailed by Theisen-Eaton, Johnson-Thompson and Ikauniece-Admidina. The Briton finished the race in first with 2:09.07 minutes (a season's best). Latvia's Ikauniece-Admidina had a personal best to finish second, but with Theisen-Eaton, close behind, she retained her bronze medal spot. Thiam ran her fifth lifetime best of the competition ended with 2:16.54 minutes. She remained 35 points clear at the top of the leaderboard and won the gold medal in a Belgian national record of 6810 points. Ennis-Hill relinquished her title with a 6775-point silver medal performance while Theisen-Eaton made her first Olympic podium in 6653 points. The standard of the performances in the field was high, with six women going beyond 6500 points in a heptathlon for the first time and best ever score for placings across the field from sixth onwards (bar ninth and twelfth). The event would ultimately prove to be Ennis-Hill's final major competition, as she announced her retirement from athletics two months later.

The medals were presented by Pierre-Olivier Beckers-Vieujant, IOC member, Belgium and Sylvia Barlag, Council Member of the IAAF.

Competition format
The heptathlon consists of seven track and field events, with a points system that awards higher scores for better results in each of the seven components. The seven event scores are summed to give a total for the heptathlon.

Records
, the existing World and Olympic records were as follows.

The following national records were established during the competition:

Schedule
All times are Brasilia Time (UTC-3)

Detailed results

100 metres hurdles
Wind:Heat 1: -0.2 m/s, Heat 2: +0.3 m/s, Heat 3: -0.3 m/s, Heat 4: 0.0 m/s

High jump

Shot put

200 metres
Wind: -0.7, +0.4, +0.0, -0.1 m/s.

Long jump

Javelin throw

800 metres

Overall results 
The final results of the event are in the following table.

Key

* – Ekaterina Voronina retired during the high jump and did not participate in the remaining events.

References

Women's heptathlon
2016
2016 in women's athletics
Women's events at the 2016 Summer Olympics